Palmariggi is a town and comune in the   province of Lecce in the Apulia region of south-east Italy.

Main sights
Mother church, dedicated to St. Luke the Evangelist, rebuilt after 1777
Sanctuary of Madonna di Montevergine
Aragonese Castle (15th century), of which only two towers remain
Menhir of Montevergine

References

Cities and towns in Apulia
Localities of Salento